Freehold Raceway Mall is a super-regional high-end shopping mall, located in Freehold Township, New Jersey. A premier shopping center for Central Jersey, the mall is located off of U.S. Route 9, Route 33, and County Route 537, opposite the Freehold Raceway. The mall is anchored by the traditional retailers Macy's, JCPenney, L.L. Bean and Primark, while also featuring the premier specialty retailers Abercrombie & Fitch, Offline by Aerie, Untuckit, Zara, Lululemon Athletica, and Michael Kors.

As of 2020, the mall is the third largest shopping mall in the state, behind Westfield Garden State Plaza in Paramus, and American Dream Meadowlands in East Rutherford.

Overview

An outdoor lifestyle addition, begun in January 2007, added  of additional retail space. On November 23, 2011, the mall was ranked in a Weather Channel news article titled "The Most Congested Malls for Black Friday". Freehold Raceway Mall ranked third in the nation.

History
Construction on Freehold Raceway Mall commenced in 1987, across the street from the Freehold Raceway on land used for stables. The stables still exist, connected by a small pedestrian/horsecart bridge over Route 9, but they can only be accessed via mall entrance road. In preparation for the mall's opening, the Freehold Circle was eliminated and rebuilt into an at-grade intersection with traffic lights and jughandles. A traffic light and jughandle for the mall entrance road from Route 9 was also constructed due south of the intersection of U.S. Route 9 and Business Route 33.

1990–2007
The mall officially opened on August 1, 1990; the public opening was preceded by a private "preview" gala and fundraiser for CentraState Medical Center which included papier-mâché racehorse centerpieces and a fabric replica of the food court's carousel, which had not yet arrived from Italy. The mall originally had two anchors: Sears and Lord & Taylor with construction already underway on JCPenney (originally planned to be Hahne's, but the company was merged into Lord & Taylor), which later opened in 1991 as well as Nordstrom, which later opened in 1992. A fifth anchor, Macy's, was opened on October 7, 1998. The mall was not initially successful. Vacancies were imminent, and many of the spaces were filled with non-traditional mall tenants, such as municipal services. Local photography clubs displayed their photos on the mall's empty walls, while other areas sported photos of the raceway and the fire that occurred in 1984.

The only evidence of the mall from Route 9 was the monument sign approaching the mall entrance, as the satellite big box stores were not yet built. Customers could also easily travel to the nearby Monmouth Mall, Seaview Square Mall, Brunswick Square Mall, or the Manalapan Mall. The crowds eventually came and the vacancy rate at the mall significantly dropped. The explosive success of the Freehold Raceway Mall in the 1990s and early 2000s ultimately led to the downfall of the nearby Manalapan Mall, which closed in 1999 (which redeveloped into the Manalapan EpiCentre), along with the Seaview Square Mall (which redeveloped into a power center.).

2007–2020

Freehold Raceway Mall was expanded in 2007, and construction began in January. The expansion was built in the space between JCPenney and Sears in the upper floor parking lot. The addition included a strip of outdoor stores along the JCPenney side of the mall, occupied by 13 to 15 stores, two restaurants, a promenade, an area for community events and a valet parking station.

In April 2007, the mall's first renovation project was underway. The renovation replaced the flooring, changing the brown and green tile to a beige stone tile, it replaced the green paint on the ceilings and ironwork with a more beige/earthtone, the brass rails were replaced in favor of wooden rails, new lighting under the skylights and along/under the columns was added, the globe lighting along the skylights, pillars and ironwork was replaced, a new escalator next to Sears was added, soft, carpeted seating areas were added and the large center court fountain was replaced with a smaller fountain, and a soft seating area.
New additions include single- and two-story retail spaces, and two new parking lots which were built on site to replace those that were lost. They are located along the Raceway Mall Drive entrance and on the opposite side of the ring road next to Nordstrom.

On July 18, 2011, Borders Books & Music announced that they will be liquidating all of their stores, including their Freehold location. In September 2013, L.L.Bean opened their third New Jersey location inside the former Borders Books & Music anchor. They hosted a grand opening festival including giveaways, contests, and also a Birds of Prey exhibit as well. On July 16, 2016, Primark joined the shopping center.

2020–present
The early 2020's saw several storied traditional department store retailers update its brick-and-mortar divisions after being disrupted by several digital retailers and the COVID pandemic in recent years.

On May 7, 2020, Nordstrom, which maintains several additional outposts close by, announced plans to shutter along with several additional locations as a direct result of the COVID-19 pandemic, focusing on its remaining top performing locations.

On August 27, 2020, Lord & Taylor announced they would shutter their brick-and-mortar retail base after modernizing into a digital collective department store.

By October 2022, after the COVID-19 shut down, Freehold Raceway Mall had announced several new additions, among them are 
Offline by Aerie, Torrid, Elite Jewelers, and Lidl. Lidl will occupy the same outparcel space that Bob's Stores used to be located. Bob's Stores will now be an attached fixture of the mall near Primark.

On May 25, 2021, the Freehold Township Planning Committee proposed a rezoning ordinance to the shopping centers in the township, the Freehold Raceway Mall property notwithstanding. The township's Business Administrator Peter Valesi, expressed the need to modernize the township's shopping centers. On July 13, 2021, the township planning board approved the amendment in a 3-1 decision. This legislation redefines the "regional mall" as a "regional mall shopping center".

The expansion of zoning allowances grants the owners of the mall the ability to potentially include more commercial amenities, such as; movie theaters, performing arts venues, indoor amusement parks, roller rinks and other assortment of recreational activities. The rezoning could also allow the mall to offer designated civic, cultural and senior citizen centers, as well as educational spaces, office spaces, breweries, and health care facilities.

The rezoning policies will allow the mall to offer more 'lifestyle' amenities, which are becoming more commonplace in other prominent malls in the state (such as what can be found at the Willowbrook Mall in Wayne or the American Dream Mall in East Rutherford), while also still preserving the prestige that this mall has earned with its reputation in featuring luxurious retailers.

Anchors

Current anchors
JCPenney
L.L.Bean
Macy's
Primark

Outparcels
AMC Theatres
Ashley Furniture HomeStores
Big Lots
Bob's Discount Furniture
Christmas Tree Shops
Dick's Sporting Goods
Home Depot
Lidl
Raymour & Flanigan

Former anchors
Lord & Taylor (closed in 2021)
Nordstrom (closed in 2020)
Sears (closed in 2020)

Outparcels
Linens 'n Things (closed in 2008)
Toys "R" Us (closed in 2018)
Bob's Stores (closed its outparcel store in 2022; reopened attached to the mall in 2023)

See also
Danbury Fair Mall in Danbury, Connecticut - Built by developer Wilmorite a few years before Freehold Raceway Mall and also currently owned by Macerich. Due to both malls being built around the same time in the New York metropolitan area, utilizing similar interior design fixtures, along with both malls residing under relatively similar socioeconomic areas and thus offering similar stores, they are sometimes attributed as retail 'twins'.

References

External links

Freehold Raceway Mall
International Council of Shopping Centers: Freehold Raceway Mall

Buildings and structures in Monmouth County, New Jersey
Shopping malls in New Jersey
Macerich
Shopping malls established in 1990
Tourist attractions in Monmouth County, New Jersey
U.S. Route 9
Shopping malls in the New York metropolitan area
Freehold Township, New Jersey
1990 establishments in New Jersey